Yosef Dayan (Hebrew: יוסף  דיין; born 1945) is a Mexican-Israeli Orthodox rabbi and right-wing Israeli monarchist and nationalist, who claims to be the most senior heir to the Davidic line. He is the founder and director of Malchut Israel, a religious right-wing political party which advocates for a monarchy in Israel. In 2004, Dayan became a founding member of the newly reconstituted Sanhedrin. He is the author of several books in Hebrew, Spanish, and Italian and has worked to translate modern Spanish literature into Hebrew.

Biography 
Yosef Dayan was born in 1945 in Mexico to Sephardic Jewish parents from Aleppo, Syria, where the Dayan family had lived for some seven hundred years. Dayan's family trace their ancestry in a direct paternal line to the Medieval Babylonian Exilarchs, who in part were direct paternal descendants of the Davidic line. He and his family paternally descends from Hasan ben Zakkai, the younger brother of the Exilarch David ben Zakkai (d. 940), whose genealogy is recounted in the rabbinic work Seder Olam Zutta which traces the line of the Exliarchs back to King David. One of Hasan's descendants Solomon ben Azariah ha-Nasi ('the Prince') settled in Aleppo where the family became dayanim ('judges') of the city and thus assumed the surname Dayan. In 1933, Yitzak Dayan, a cousin of Yosef Dayan's father was considered by some Orthodox rabbis to be the heir and titular "King of Israel". After his death none of his three sons pursued their father's dynastic claims. After Yosef Dayan made aliyah to Israel in 1968, he was encouraged by several Orthodox rabbis to be an active claimant to the Davidic line. Soon after this, Dayan became a member of the right-wing Kach movement, where he was instrumental in establishing the Hebron Hills settlement of El-Nakam, which was destroyed on the orders of the then-Minister of Defense, Moshe Arens in 1982. Dayan later founded "Malchut Israel", a right-wing religious-political group in Israel advocating a return of the monarchy. In 2004, he became a member of the newly reconstituted Sanhedrin, a duplicate of the religious tribunal which convened during the time of the Second Temple, a group that had traditionally had seventy-one members. He is alleged to have participated in so-called "death curse" ceremonies or Pulsa diNura aimed at Yitzhak Rabin and Ariel Sharon, presumably requesting divine retribution after those former prime ministers advocated Israeli withdrawal from Palestinian areas considered by Zionists to be inalienable parts of the promised land. He also supported Baruch Goldstein's (a fellow Meir Kahane disciple) terrorist actions in the Cave of the Patriarchs Massacre.

His son, Hananel Dayan-Meged, refused to shake the hand of Dan Halutz, the (former) Chief of Staff of the Israeli Defence Force, while receiving the "President of Israel Excellence Citation" during the Israeli Independence Day celebrations.

References

External links
Malchut Yisra'el Website
Soldier who snubbed Halutz ejected

1945 births
Living people
Israeli Sephardi Jews
Israeli Orthodox Jews
Israeli Kahanists
Israeli monarchists
Israeli people of Mexican-Jewish descent
Israeli translators
Mexican emigrants to Israel
Mexican Sephardi Jews
Translators from Spanish
Translators to Hebrew